Balonmano Gijón is a women's handball team based in Gijón, Asturias which currently plays in División de Plata, the second division in the Spanish league system. It played several seasons in Liga ABF, the top league, last time in the 2011–12 season, where it was relegated.

Season by season

Notable players 
  Jessica Alonso
  Marisol Carratu
  Yacaira Tejeda
  Ana Temprano
  Débora Torreira

External links
Official website 

Sport in Gijón
Handball clubs established in 1982
Spanish handball clubs
1982 establishments in Spain
Sports teams in Asturias